Patrice Augustin (born May 27, 1955 in Saint-Sauvant, France) is a former professional footballer.

External links
Patrice Augustin profile at chamoisfc79.fr

1955 births
Living people
French footballers
Association football forwards
Chamois Niortais F.C. players
Angers SCO players
Tours FC players
Stade Brestois 29 players
Ligue 1 players
Ligue 2 players